Robert Davies  (born 1869) was a Welsh footballer who played as a forward for Chester and Wrexham in the 1880s and 1890s. He also made two appearances for Wales in 1892.

Football career
Davies was born in  Caergwrle, about 5 miles north of Wrexham. He started his career with Chester in 1888 before joining his village team in 1891. He then spent two years with Wrexham where he was considered to be a "capable" winger who had pace and showed "neat skills".

His first international appearance came on 27 February 1892, when he was selected to play against Ireland; the match ended with the scores level with one goal each. Davies retained his place for the next match against England which ended in a 2–0 victory for the English. The English team consisted mainly of players associated with the Corinthian club, who were "a little too skilful for the Welsh". Davies himself was described as "weak" in his international appearances.

In 1893, he was part of the Wrexham side who won the Welsh Cup, defeating  Chirk 2–1. Wrexham next reached the final in 1895, but this time lost 3–2 to Newtown. This was Davies' final appearance for Wrexham.

In 1895, he returned to playing for his village team, and was still playing in 1913.

International appearances
Davies made two appearances for Wales in international matches, as follows:

Career outside football
Before becoming a professional footballer, Davies was a coal-miner. He was also a keen cricketer who was a notable bowler for Caergwrle Cricket Club.

Honours
Wrexham
 Welsh Cup winners: 1893
 Welsh Cup finalists: 1895

References

External links

1869 births
Sportspeople from Flintshire
Year of death missing
Welsh footballers
Wales international footballers
Association football forwards
Chester City F.C. players
Wrexham A.F.C. players